Eugeniusz Molski (born in 1942 in Bagienice, Masovian Voivodeship) is a Polish contemporary artist, painter and sculptor. Attended a State Fine Arts College in Nałęczów and a State Academy of Fine Arts in Wrocław where he obtained his diploma in 1969. He specializes in architectural painting and ceramics. Since 1969 he has been employed at the Fine Arts College in Nowy Wiśnicz. He does mural and easel painting as well as ceramics and sculpture.

Collective exhibitions abroad 
 Stockholm /Sweden/, Düsseldorf, Frechen /Germany/ - 1978
 Nuremberg – ceramics, 1981,83,84
 Bratislava – painting 1983
 Kiev – painting 1983
 Faenza (Italy) – international ceramics biennial 1984, 87
 Kecskemét (Hungary) – enamel 1985
 Hradec Králové – ceramics 1988
 Frechen – ceramics 1994–98, 2000–2007
 Erkrath – 1988, 99, 2001 International Art Fair.

Major individual exhibitions 
 Wrocław “Pałacyk” Gallery (twice), Gallery of the “Kalambur” Theatre (twice)
 Tarnów: Regional Museum, DK Azoty, PSP Gallery (three times), BWA Gallery “Sztylet”, KIK Gallery “Pod Aniołem”, WBP, MBP, Tarnów Theatre
 Kraków: “Forum” Gallery, City Cultural Center, PSP Gallery, “Cepelia” Gallery
 Słupsk: BWA Gallery
 Dębica: MOK Gallery
 Mielec: DK Gallery
 Toruń: BWA
 Biała Podlaska: BWA Gallery
 Miechów: BWA Gallery
 Bochnia: Public Library, S. Fischer Museum
 Zakopane; Gorlice: Karwacjanow Manor
 Kuopio (Finland): Public Library; Joensu, Kajani (Finland): Gallery of the Lutheran Diocese “Dialog”
 Budapest: Polish Culture and Information Center
 Prague (Czech Republic)
 Bratislava; Trencin (Slovakia)
 Myślenice: Museum.

Works in museum collections 
 Toruń: Regional Museum
 Bolesławiec: Ceramics Museum
 Tarnów: Regional Museum
 Bochnia: City Museum
 Wałbrzych-Książ: ceramics collection
 Kecskemet (Hungary): Cifra Palota Museum.

Awards and prizes 
 1973 – Toruń, Regional Museum: “Hymn” to Museum collection
 1977 – Bolesławiec, BOK: award of the Polish Artists’ Association
 1978 – Kraków, BWA Gallery, Sculpture of the Year for Southern Poland Award; Tarnów, BWA Gallery, Award of the City Mayor; Regional Museum: sculpture “Fazy” /Phases/ to the collection
 1980-1981- Debrzno – award of the plein-air hosts “Ceramics for Architecture”, awards of the Gdynia Construction Ceramics Company, among others, first prize in a competition for a ceramic wall; Łódź: PAX Gallery, III prize at the exhibition “Sacrum in Contemporary Art”
 1984 – Rzeszów, KMPiK, distinction in a competition “Rzeszów Old Town”; Książ, Polish Ceramics Biennial, III prize
 1987 – Kraków BWA Gallery, award at an exhibition of “Craft ‘87”
 1988 – Kraków, KDK “Pod Baranami” award at a mask competition
 1989 – Kraków BWA, Grand Prix in a “Primum non nocere” competition; Katowice, BWA, III prize at an exhibition of industrial forms
 1998 – Kraków, Archdiocese Museum
 2001 – Bochnia, Fischer Museum (purchase)
 2003 – Bochnia, Fischer Museum.

External links
home website of Eugeniusz Molski 

Polish sculptors
Polish male sculptors
1942 births
20th-century Polish painters
20th-century Polish male artists
21st-century Polish painters
21st-century male artists
Polish contemporary artists
Living people
20th-century sculptors
Polish male painters
People from Przasnysz County